Moonnilavu  is a village in Kottayam district in the state of Kerala, India.

Demographics
 India census, Moonnilavu had a population of 9525 with 4723 males and 4802 females.

References

Villages in Kottayam district